The Roman Catholic Diocese of Zipaquirá is a diocese located in the city of Zipaquirá in the Ecclesiastical province of Bogotá in Colombia.

History
It was established on September 1, 1951, as the Diocese of Zipaquirá, from the Metropolitan Archdiocese of Bogotá.

Special churches
Minor Basilicas:
Basilica de Santo Cristo de Ubaté, Ubaté
Basilica de San Jacinto de Guasca, Guasca.
The Salt Cathedral of Zipaquirá is in the diocese, but is administratively an ordinary church; the title "cathedral" is unofficial.

Bishops

Ordinaries
Tulio Botero Salazar, C.M. (1952.05.01 – 1957.12.08) Appointed, Archbishop of Medellín
Buenaventura Jáuregui Prieto (1957.12.08 – 1974.07.08)
Rubén Buitrago Trujillo, O.A.R. (1974.07.08 – 1991.09.27)
Jorge Enrique Jiménez Carvajal, C.I.M. (1992.11.09 – 2004.02.06) Appointed, Coadjutor Archbishop of Cartagena
Héctor Cubillos Peña (2004.06.30 – present)

Other priests of this diocese who became bishops
Fernando Sabogal Viana, appointed Auxiliary Bishop of Bogotá in 1996
Daniel Caro Borda, appointed Auxiliary Bishop of Bogotá in 2000
Hernán Alvarado Solano, appointed Vicar Apostolic of Guapi in 2001
Raúl Alfonso Carrillo Martínez, appointed Vicar Apostolic of Puerto Gaitán in 2016

See also
Roman Catholicism in Colombia

References

External links

 GCatholic.org

Roman Catholic dioceses in Colombia
Roman Catholic Ecclesiastical Province of Bogotá
Christian organizations established in 1951
Roman Catholic dioceses and prelatures established in the 20th century
Zipaquirá
1951 establishments in Colombia